Fleury Linossier was a water color painter born in 1902 near Paris. He entered the Ecole des Beaux Arts in Toulon, graduated as an Architect and then returned to Lyon from where his family originated. He started designing parks and gardens of the area. He inherited from his father and grandfather both landscape architects the passion and sense of nature. Later he moved to Bandol in the French Riviera, created his firm of architecture and earned a reputation in the construction of mansions for celebrities  such as Gregory Peck, Raimu, Maurice Chevalier, Mistinguett.

During World War II, he joined the French resistance and led a very active network of information. Acting for the liberation of the port of Toulon, he was decorated with the Médaille Militaire, the Croix de guerre 1939–1945 and the Croix du combattant volontaire de la Résistance.

His career as a painter really started in the sixties. In Paris, he exhibited in the Salon des Artistes Français , the Salon of the Surindependants, Salon of the Beaux Art.  He showed also in the Salon de Bollene, in Monaco at the International Salon of the Contemporary Painting and numerous galleries. Rainier III, Prince of Monaco bought three of his works. He received plenty awards, gold medals and first prices. Specialized press praised him as one of the best landscape water color artists of his time and compared him to J. M. W. Turner and Jean-Baptiste-Camille Corot. Some of the press extract below give a good idea of Fleury Linossier’s impact. He produced an exceptional and sizable work until his late eighties. At this time, he started losing his sight and chose to give up painting afraid of not being able to master his production. He disappeared soon after, leaving unique works now considered as an essential contribution to his century.

'''Some Press Extracts:'''“…Fleury Linossier is fiercely independent, on the fringe of the aesthetic fashion; continuity and sincerity are his main qualities. We owe this artist in love with light, graceful and beautiful works of art…What a refreshing vision! His technique, his virtuosity makes him one of the most well-known aquarellists.” Denise David, L'Amateur d'Art, October 1977.
“A poet from the 19th century lost in our.” “Jongkind, Corot and Turner would have painted today this same vaporous luminosity.” “A Linossier is recognizable from far away because it is beautiful.” Rene Nicolas, La Cote des Arts, January 1981.
“Romanticism or impressionism? Difficult to say to define Fleury Linossier’s style…Bathed in a political atmosphere, each of his creation is an incisive work…He reminds us of Corot…who painted in the Rome area some landscapes where the concordance of the sunrise and sunset met in rare harmonies.” Georges Gustavo, Le Provençal, October 1971.

References

1902 births
Year of death missing
20th-century French architects
20th-century French painters
20th-century French male artists
French male painters
French watercolourists